S100 calcium binding protein A14 (S100A14) is a protein that in humans is encoded by the S100A14 gene.

Function 

This gene encodes a member of the S100 protein family which contains an EF-hand motif and binds calcium. The gene is located in a cluster of S100 genes on chromosome 1. Levels of the encoded protein have been found to be lower in cancerous tissue and associated with metastasis suggesting a tumor suppressor function.

References

Further reading 

 
 
 
 
 
 
 

S100 proteins